The Milperra Massacre, Milperra bikie shoot-out or Father's Day Massacre was a gunfight between rival motorcycle gang members on 2 September (Father's Day in Australia) 1984, in Milperra, a south-western suburb of Sydney, New South Wales. The gunfight had its roots in the rivalry that developed after a group of Comancheros broke away and formed the first Bandidos Motorcycle Club chapter in Australia. Seven people were killed and twenty-eight injured and the event was a catalyst for significant changes to gun laws in New South Wales.

Prelude
Police believe that the war began over turf, drugs or a combination of both. The clubs had a no drugs policy and Colin "Caesar" Campbell, Sergeant-at-Arms of both Comanchero chapters and Sergeant-at-Arms of the Bandidos after they were patched over, points to the acrimony of the split as the sole reason. According to Campbell, in late 1983, one of his brothers and another Comanchero had called on another member and caught the Comancheros' president (and founder) William George "Jock" Ross, in a compromising position with the member's wife. As Sergeant-at-Arms, he ordered Ross to face charges of breaking one of the ten club rules. If found guilty, Ross would have been expelled from the club. Ross failed to appear at the first two meetings and after arriving at the third, simply announced that the club would be split into two chapters and walked out. Those who supported bringing charges against Ross, the six Campbell brothers, the three McElwaine brothers, Anthony "Snodgrass" Spencer (Snoddy) and Charles "Charlie" Sciberras remained at the Birchgrove clubhouse that overlooked Yurulbin Park while Ross and the remaining Comancheros set up a new clubhouse in Harris Park.

During the club's 1983 Christmas run fighting broke out between the two chapters, prompting the Birchgrove chapter to break away and form a new club. Spencer had visited several outlaw clubs in America two years earlier and remembered how much respect U.S Bandidos showed to him, so he contacted their National President Ronnie Hodge. After much correspondence, he received approval to form the first Australian Bandidos chapter and become its national president. The new Bandidos members then incinerated their Comanchero colours in a ceremonial act. Clubhouse attacks and other violence continued until August when Campbell alleged that Spencer and Ross "declared war" in a phone call.

Battle
An advertisement for a British motorcycle club swap meet was placed in a few local press releases, to be held at the Viking Tavern, with a scheduled start at 10 am on Sunday, 2 September 1984. On that day at around 1 pm, 19 armed Comancheros entered the car park of the Viking Tavern during the swap meet and took up positions in hiding. Using walkie-talkies for communication, Comanchero leader "Jock" Ross, a military enthusiast, intended to stand in the open to give the appearance he was alone, hoping to draw the Bandidos into a pincer movement that was based on the "Bullhorn Ambush" that he read had been used in the Anglo-Zulu War. He was distracted by the presence of members of a rival club the Mobshitters and went to the back of the tavern to ensure they were not going to get involved.

The Bandidos were late and, thinking that the opposing gang was not coming, some Comancheros went into the Viking Tavern bar. About 20 minutes later, 34 equally armed Bandidos members arrived. Caught off guard, the Comancheros were scattered around the car park. The Bandidos pulled up in a group at the western end of the car park and after distributing guns and other weapons, moved to confront the Comancheros president. The initial confrontation between the clubs was verbal, involving the brandishing of "non-lethal" weapons and challenges to drop the guns and settle it like men but ended with the accidental discharge of a shotgun into the air. The involuntary discharge was the catalyst for pitched battle involving fists, guns and other weapons. Contrary to some newspaper reports, there was no charge toward one another, nor were formal battle lines drawn. Although never mentioned by the media or charged, several wives and girlfriends of the club members took part.

Once the first shot was fired, it evolved into a series of bashings and kickings with sporadic gunfire. Bandido member Gregory "Shadow" Campbell was shot in the throat by a shotgun and died instantly. Because of the number of charges this man's brother was charged with the murder. Bandidos vice president Mario "Chopper" Cianter was shot twice in the chest with a shotgun and died instantly. After realising he'd been caught off guard and not having had the chance to set up a formal battle plan, Jock Ross ran from the back of the tavern holding a machete in one hand and a pick handle in the other. Almost immediately he was hit in the foot by shotgun pellets. Staggering on, he was hit again in the head and chest and collapsed.

Police responded after receiving reports that a man had gone berserk with a rifle at the Viking Tavern in Milperra and that shots had been fired. The fighting continued for at least 10 minutes, while police helicopters circled overhead, with members of the public fleeing to the tavern and nearby properties as soon as the shooting started. The first of more than 200 police arrived 15 minutes after the fighting ended and cordoned off the area. Two Comancheros had died from shotgun wounds, another two Comancheros died after being shot with a Rossi .357 Magnum rifle, two Bandidos died from shotgun wounds and a 14-year-old bystander, Leanne Walters, also died after being hit in the face by a stray .357 bullet. A further 28 people were wounded with 20 requiring hospitalisation. 

Ron Stephenson who led the police investigation into the shoot-out stated in 1994: "In the middle of it all, the pub staff were still selling beer. People actually sat in the hotel drinking while the war was going on outside. I will never forget the sight when I arrived that day. The car park was packed with leather-clad bikies, police and ambulance officers treating the injured. One sergeant arrived with a young constable and commented, ‘Take a look at this son because you’ll never see anything like it again.’ The bikies appeared to be quite proud of what they had done." Constable John Garvey who arrived at the scene stated: "The wounds on the men were horrific. I mean, those sorts of weapons can do some terrible damage." Garvey was confronted by  Raymond “Sunshine” Kucler of the Comancheros who was armed with a shotgun. Gavery recalled: "Kucler was covered in blood and appeared to have a wound below one eye. He was very pent-up; you could see the anger and emotion in his eyes. The situation had suddenly changed, and I knew it was a critical moment in which my life was in danger. Here I was armed with a shotgun facing a very angry man with a shotgun he had obviously used; it was not something I could walk away from. Kucler wanted me to get ambulances to help his injured mates but I told him we couldn’t until he surrendered his weapon. We argued and finally he said he would give up his gun if I did the same.". Both men placed their shotguns on the ground.

Bandidos sergeant-at-arms, Colin "Caesar" Campbell, was shot six times and spent six weeks in intensive care before checking himself out. Four shotgun pellets remained in his body which were dug out by his wife before he fled to Western Australia. Campbell later claimed that the wife of one of the Comancheros had shot him several times with a handgun.

Mark Pennington, one of the first police officers on the scene, was later awarded $380,000 (2011: $1,026,500) compensation for psychological damage. Bandido member John "Whack" Campbell never fully recovered from the injuries he received and in 1987 died in jail from complications. Jock Ross suffered a brain injury after being shot in the head. He lost much of his vision as well as the ability to read and write. The Viking Tavern has since been renamed the Mill Hotel.

One man who took part in the shoot-out in the Viking Tavern who wished to be  anonymous stated in 2014: “Milperra was catastrophic; it was a ridiculous and terrible thing to happen. We have all paid a terrible price and we will never be allowed to forget it or escape from it...Milperra changed everything. We came from all walks from life — optometrists, engineers, clerks and blue collar workers — and all had our reasons for being there (in a motorcycle gang). Many of us just wanted to escape our dreary lives; escape for one night a week, dress up like Marlon Brando and be a wild one." Stephenson dismissed the later claims made by both the Comancheros and Bandidos that no violence was planned for the swap meet as he stated: "I simply can’t accept that. They knew it was going to happen and both gangs were prepared for the fight. They had declared war on each other, and once that happens you can be assured a full-scale battle will take place if they meet in public".

Aftermath

Trial
The court case following the "Milperra Massacre" was at the time one of the largest in Australian history. In total 43 people were charged with seven counts of murder under the doctrine of "common purpose" charges against 10 were dropped before trial and Bernard "Bernie" Podgorski, secretary of the Bandidos, was granted immunity after turning Queen's Evidence. Solicitor Christopher Murphy acted for the Bandidos' members charged over the incident. Greg James QC, represented all but one of the Bandidos' members during their trial, that being Colin Campbell. Greg James QC was Juniored by a number of Juniors including John Korn, Kenneth Rosin, Andrew Martin and Philip Young. Mr. Campbell was represented by Mr Greg Woods QC. Anthony "Snoddy" Spencer, the Bandidos National President, hanged himself in prison before he could stand trial. Michael Alan Viney QC was the lead Crown Prosecutor for the committal hearing and the trial.

During the longest joint criminal trial in New South Wales history, 58 policemen provided security including armed members of the Tactical Operations Unit who were stationed in the courtroom and witnesses required armed guards from the Witness Security Unit to escort them home. With 31 accused, each by law able to reject 20 jurors without giving a reason, 1,500 jurors were called up and housed at the Penrith Leagues Club to await selection. The first day of selection saw only five jurors accepted from 208 presented, the following day it was found that two were ineligible with justice Roden dismissing all five and ordering that jury selection begin again. Eventually some 1,000 jurors were presented before 12 were found acceptable to sit on the case.  More than two years later, on 12 June 1987, the jury delivered 63 murder convictions, 147 manslaughter convictions and 31 of affray. The judge in the case named the instigator of the violence as William "Jock" Ross, the "supreme commander" of the Comancheros, saying "Ross was primarily responsible for the decision that members of his club go to Milperra in force and armed".

Ross received a life sentence for his role in the violence. Four other members of the Comancheros gang received life sentences for murder and 16 Bandidos received sentences of seven years for manslaughter. As the Bandidos arrested were charged in regards to all the deaths, this resulted in Colin Campbell being found guilty of the manslaughter of his brother. Another Campbell brother, John "Wack" Campbell, died three years later from his injuries.  Commonwealth Games gold medallist boxer Philip "Knuckles" McElwaine was found guilty only of affray; he was the only motorcycle club member to be acquitted of the manslaughter and murder charges that were brought against him. In 1989, three Comancheros appealed their murder convictions with the charge quashed and reduced to manslaughter. In 1992, Ross was the last to be released after serving five years and three months.

Changes to gun laws
The Comancheros were notorious for carrying registered shotguns openly while riding. As a result of the massacre, the New South Wales Firearms and Dangerous Weapons Act 1973, which allowed registered owners the right to carry firearms in public, was subsequently amended to require "a good reason for the issue of a [firearm] licence".

Resumption of hostilities
In a repetition of the circumstances that led to the Milperra massacre, in early 2007 more than 60 members of the Parramatta and Granville chapters of the Nomads, previously affiliated with the Comancheros, defected to the Bandidos. The defection resulted in a new eruption of violence between the Comancheros and Bandidos involving fire-bombings and drive-by shootings. New South Wales Police set up Operation Ranmore to stop the violence escalating, which resulted in 340 people arrested on 883 charges as of January 2008.

Dramatisation
In 2002, Australian film maker Martin Brown produced a documentary titled 1% One Percenters Search for a Screenplay in an effort to raise interest for a big budget movie of the massacre. The documentary, first aired on 2 February 2003, follows Brown as he looks for screenwriters, funds and a director for his movie. It includes interviews with the police investigating officer, former superintendent Ron Stephenson, Comanchero president "Jock" Ross, Bandido vice president "Bullets" and several other Milperra survivors.

A television mini-series Bikie Wars: Brothers in Arms, based on the book Brothers in Arms by Lindsay Simpson and Sandra Harvey, screened on Australias Network Ten in May 2012. The screenplay was written by Greg Haddrick, Roger Simpson and Jo Martino. It is directed by Peter Andrikidis. It stars Callan Mulvey, Matthew Nable, Susie Porter, Maeve Dermody, Anthony Hayes, Todd Lasance, Luke Ford, Jeremy Lindsay Taylor, Damian Walshe-Howling, Nathaniel Dean and Luke Hemsworth.  Colin "Caesar" Campbell has criticized the series for a lack of consultation with those who were there, its incorrect chronology of events, errors in motives and the portrayal of "lazy stereotypes".

Further reading
 
 Casualty Disambiguation:  see Federal Court of Australia (Sydney NSW) decision on 22 September 2014 in Francis v Allen & Unwin [2014] FCA 1027 by Katzmann J, parties Janette Gail Francis v Allen & Unwin Pty Limited, Lindsay Simpson, Pamela Walters, Rex Walters, Lorraine Walters.

See also
 List of disasters in Australia by death toll

Notes

Footnotes

References

External links
 

Massacres in 1984
Murder in Sydney
People murdered by Australian organised crime
Bandidos Motorcycle Club
Deaths by firearm in New South Wales
Gun politics in Australia
Outlaw motorcycle club conflicts
Organised crime conflicts in Australia
Mass shootings in Australia
1980s in Sydney
September 1984 events in Australia
1984 murders in Australia
Organised crime in Sydney
Massacres in Australia